Éric Garcin (born 6 December 1965 in Avignon) is a French professional football coach and a former player.

External links

1965 births
Living people
Sportspeople from Avignon
French footballers
Toulouse FC players
Nîmes Olympique players
Le Mans FC players
Motherwell F.C. players
Dundee F.C. players
Ligue 1 players
Ligue 2 players
Scottish Football League players
Scottish Premier League players
French expatriate footballers
Expatriate footballers in Scotland
French football managers
Grenoble Foot 38 managers
FC Rouen managers
Association football defenders
AC Avignonnais players